A perpetual count was a head or an ispán of a county in the Kingdom of Hungary (“Lord Lieutenant”) whose office was either hereditary or attached to the dignity of a prelate or of a great officer of the realm. The earliest examples of a perpetual ispánate are from the 12th century, but the institution flourished between the 15th and 18th centuries. Although all administrative functions of the office were abolished in 1870, the title itself was preserved until the general abolition of noble titles in Hungary in 1946.

History

List of perpetual ispánates

Ex officio ispánates

Hereditary ispánates

See also
 County (Kingdom of Hungary)
 Ispán

Footnotes

References

  Engel, Pál (1996). Magyarország világi archontológiája, 1301–1457, I. ("Secular Archontology of Hungary, 1301–1457, Volume I"). História, MTA Történettudományi Intézete. Budapest. .
 Engel, Pál (2001). The Realm of St Stephen: A History of Medieval Hungary, 895-1526. I.B. Tauris Publishers. .
  Fallenbüchl, Zoltán (1994). Magyarország főispánjai, 1526–1848 ("Lord-Lieutenants of Counties in Hungary, 1526–1848"). Argumentum Kiadó.  .
  Nemes, Lajos (1989). Entry örökös főispán in: Bán, Péter; Magyar történelmi fogalomtár, I. kötet: L–Zs [=Thesaurus of Terms of Hungarian History, Volume I: L–Zs]. Gondolat. . 
 Rady, Martyn (2000). Nobility, Land and Service in Medieval Hungary. Palgrave (in association with School of Slavonic and East European Studies, University College London). .
 Sedlar, Jean W. (1994). East Central Europe in the Middle Ages, 1000–1500. University of Washington Press. . 
  Zsoldos, Attila (2011). Magyarország világi archontológiája, 1000–1301 ("Secular Archontology of Hungary, 1000–1301"). História, MTA Történettudományi Intézete. Budapest. .

Hungarian noble titles